The 1970 French Open was a tennis tournament that was held at the Stade Roland Garros in Paris in France from 25 May through 7 June 1970. It was the 74th edition of the French Open, the 40th to be open to foreign competitors, and the second Grand Slam of the year. Jan Kodeš and Margaret Court won the singles titles.

Finals

Men's singles

 Jan Kodeš defeated  Željko Franulović, 6–2, 6–4, 6–0
• It was Kodeš' 1st career Grand Slam singles title.

Women's singles

 Margaret Court defeated  Helga Niessen Masthoff, 6–2, 6–4
• It was Court's 18th career Grand Slam singles title, her 5th during the Open Era and her 4th title at the French Open.

Men's doubles

 Ilie Năstase /  Ion Țiriac defeated  Arthur Ashe /  Charlie Pasarell, 6–2, 6–4, 6–3
• It was Năstase's 1st career Grand Slam doubles title and his 1st and only title at the French Open.
• It was Țiriac's 1st and only career Grand Slam doubles title.

Women's doubles

 Gail Chanfreau /  Françoise Dürr defeated  Rosemary Casals /  Billie Jean King, 6–1, 3–6, 6–3
• It was Chanfreau's 2nd career Grand Slam doubles title, her 1st during the Open Era and her 2nd title at the French Open.
• It was Dürr's 5th career Grand Slam doubles title, her 4th during the Open Era and her 4th (consecutive) title at the French Open.

Mixed doubles

 Billie Jean King /  Bob Hewitt defeated  Françoise Dürr /  Jean-Claude Barclay, 3–6, 6–4, 6–2

Prize money

References

External links
 French Open official website

 
1970 Grand Prix (tennis)
1970 in French tennis
1970 in Paris